Karen Barbat was the defending champion, but lost in the second round to Angeliki Kairi.

Maria Sakkari won the title, defeating Anastasia Pivovarova in the final, 6–4, 7–5.

Seeds

Main draw

Finals

Top half

Bottom half

References 
 Main draw

Tampere Open - Women's Singles
2014 WS